Bogren is a surname. Notable people with the surname include:

Anna Bogren, Swedish orienteering competitor
Arne Bogren, Swedish sprint canoeist
Jens Bogren, Swedish record producer
Magnus Bogren (born 1972), Swedish ice hockey coach
Michael S. Bogren (born 1958), American attorney